Hibbertia argyrochiton is a species of flowering plant in the family Dilleniaceae and is endemic to northern parts of the Northern Territory. It is a shrub densely covered with scales and has elliptic to lance-shaped leaves, and yellow flowers usually arranged singly in leaf axils, with twenty to twenty-four stamens arranged in groups around the two carpels.

Description
There are twenty to twenty-four stamens arranged in groups around the two carpels, each carpel with two ovules. Flowering mainly occurs from February to June.

Taxonomy
Hibbertia argyrochiton was first formally described in 2010 by Hellmut R. Toelken in the Journal of the Adelaide Botanic Gardens from specimens collected by Lyndley Craven on the Arnhem Plateau in 1973. The specific epithet (argyrochiton) is derived from Greek and means "a silvery coat of armour", referring to the scales on the foliage.

Distribution and habitat
This hibbertia grows in shallow sand in rock crevices in woodland in the northern parts of the Northern Territory.

Conservation status
Goodenia argyrochiton is classified as of "least concern" under the Northern Territory Government Territory Parks and Wildlife Conservation Act 1976 and is locally frequent in Kakadu National Park.

See also
List of Hibbertia species

References

argyrochiton
Flora of the Northern Territory
Plants described in 2010
Taxa named by Hellmut R. Toelken